Massilia lutea is a Gram-negative, non-spore-forming, short rod-shaped, motile bacterium with a peritrichous flagellum from the genus Massilia and family Oxalobacteraceae.

Etymology
The specific name lutea comes from the Latin lutea which means golden yellow, because of the color of its colonies.

References

External links
Type strain of Massilia lutea at BacDive -  the Bacterial Diversity Metadatabase

Burkholderiales
Bacteria described in 2006